Amynthas is a genus of earthworms in the family Megascolecidae. They are known as jumping worms, snake worms, or crazy worms because of their erratic thrashing behaviour when disturbed. The genus is native to East Asia, but they are invasive in many areas of the United States. They are a matter of concern in many states, as they disrupt the native forest ecology by affecting soil structure and chemistry.

Appearance 
Amynthas species can be differentiated from other earthworms by their clitellum, which is pale, annular, is close to the head, and lies flat against the body.

Life cycle 
Amynthas species' faster reproduction rate, and their ability to reproduce asexually (parthenogenesis) has contributed to their spread into the United States. The worms reach maturity in 60 days, which allows them to have two hatches per year. Eggs are rapped in small cocoons, which overwinter while the adults die off. The young then emerge next spring.

Species
 Amynthas agrestis (Goto and Hatai, 1899)
 Amynthas alexandri (Beddard, 1900)
 Amynthas assimilis (Hong & Kim, 2002)
 Amynthas borealis (Panha & Bantaowong, 2011)
 Amynthas comptus (Gates, 1932)
 Amynthas defecta (Gates, 1930)
 Amynthas dorualis
 Amynthas exiguus (Gates, 1930)
 Amynthas fucosus (Gates, 1933)
 Amynthas gracilis (Kinberg, 1867)
 Amynthas hilgendorfi (Michaelsen, 1892)
 Amynthas hupbonensis (Stephenson, 1931)
 Amynthas japonicus (Horst, 1883)
 Amynthas kinmenensis
 Amynthas longicauliculatus (Gates, 1931)
 Amynthas luridus (Shen, Chang, & Chih, 2019)
 Amynthas mekongianus (Cognetti, 1922)
 Amynthas minimus
 Amynthas mirifius
 Amynthas moakensis
 Amynthas morrisi (Beddard, 1892)
 Amynthas mujuensis
 Amynthas obsoletus
 Amynthas papulosus (Rosa, 1896)
 Amynthas phatubensis (Panha & Bantaowong, 2011)
 Amynthas polyglandularis
 Amynthas pulvinus
 Amynthas ruiyenensis (Shen, Chang, & Chih, 2019)
 Amynthas sangumburi
 Amynthas siam (Blakemore, 2011)
 Amynthas srinan (Panha & Bantaowong, 2011)
 Amynthas taiwumontis
 Amynthas tessellatus
 Amynthas tokioensis (Beddard, 1892)
 Amynthas tontong (Panha & Bantaowong, 2011)
 Amynthas wuhumontis
 Amynthas wujhouensis

References

Haplotaxida
Annelid genera
Megascolecidae